Sergino is a given name. Notable people with the name include:
 Sergiño Dest (born 2000), Dutch-American soccer player
 Sergino Eduard (born 1994), Surinamese footballer

Masculine given names